4Children was a charity in the United Kingdom focusing on children and families. Formerly the National Out of School Alliance and then the Kids' Club Network, the organisation was formed in 1983 to promote and develop a concept of after-school provision following research conducted by the British Association of Settlements and Social Action Centre (BASSAC).

4Children ran 88 Sure Start Children's Centres across the country, 42 nurseries, 21 out of school clubs and provides services in 24 activity centres at Royal Air Force bases in partnership with the RAF Benevolent Fund..

History

National Out of School Alliance (1980-1987)
 In 1980 a number of research and pilot projects set up during the International Year of the Child in 1979 led to the formation of the Out of School Project. The goal of this project was to support and encourage community-based out of school schemes and local authority provision in schools, youth clubs etc., by providing the necessary advice, information, training and research. In collaboration with the Thames Television Telethon which provided support to the new and existing local groups, this eventually led to the formation of the National Out of School Alliance. The Alliance became an independent organization in 1983 and aimed to promote care and education of children during out of school hours and holidays.
 The number of staff employed had doubled by 1989 and the Alliance published its Guidelines of Good Practice for Out of School Care – for which they received the 1989 Prince of Wales award.

Kids' Club Network 1990-1999
In 1990 the Alliance was re-registered as the Kids’ Clubs Network. There were 300 kids’ clubs in the UK, but the organisation estimated that a total of 25,000 clubs – one in every neighbourhood or near every primary school – were needed.  A year later the first regional offices opened in Merseyside and Wales.  By 1992 10 regional development projects were operational and the number of kids’ clubs had risen to 600, and in 1994 the 1000th kids’ club was opened in Walsall.  Kids’ Clubs Network expanded rapidly in Wales and a Welsh Head Office was established in Cardiff. Tony Blair attended the opening of the 2000th Kids’ Club at Sedgefield Out of School Fun Club. The first National Kids’ Clubs Day was held on 7 June 1995.  Over 600 delegates attended the 1998 Kids’ Clubs Network's conference.

In 2000, Kids’ Clubs Network set up the Childcare Commission – an independent inquiry into the future for childcare and family support. Chaired by the Harriet Harman MP, the Commission published its findings in January 2001.

4Children
In 2004 Kids’ Clubs Network changed its name to 4Children. The newly named organisation was officially launched at the organisation's annual policy conference ‘Tomorrow’s World’ at the Queen Elizabeth II Conference Centre in Westminster. The following year the charity announced plans to expand their work by running children's centres in partnership with local government. In 2005 4Children’s first Children’s Centre, the Carousel Centre in Essex, was launched. In 2009, 4Children launched the Family Commission, an inquiry which asked 10,000 families about their experiences of family life and family policy in the UK. Chaired jointly by Esther Rantzen and Anne Longfield, the report underlined the need for greater understanding in public services for the reality of family life, and successfully called for the extension of Children's Centres.

Strategic Partnership
4Children was Department for Education's strategic partner for early years and childcare. 4Children also ran a website, 4Children's Foundation Years to support early years professionals.

Campaigns
The Give Me Strength campaign, was launched in May 2011. It called on government, communities and families to take action to solve problems early to prevent family breakdown. The campaign also called on central and local Government to provide: A new family friendly approach to services, support for all families with specialist support for those families with complex and multiple problems, a new approach to services to put families first with practical help and support to tackle problems early as they develop

The Make Space for Health campaign was the charity's longest-running one, and was intended to inform young people about healthy lifestyles.

The Shout Out for a Sure Start campaign was launched in February 2010 to ensure that Sure Start Children's Centres were kept at the top of the agenda through the 2010 election and beyond. A coalition of more than 30 charities and other organisations along with children's TV character Peppa Pig backed the campaign and Sure Start funding was protected in cash terms in that autumn's Comprehensive Spending Review. The campaign later released research on projected Sure Start Children's Centre closures and gave guidance to parents on how to campaign against local cuts and closures to Sure Start.

Closure
4Children began a period of rapid corporate growth under its Chief Executive Anne Longfield. However, this was not matched by growing revenues and the charity ran into financial trouble. It ceased operations and entered administration on 1 September 2016. Before its financial difficulties were publicly known, Longfield was appointed Children's Commissioner for England. Many of its functions were assumed by Action for Children.

References

Further reading

External links 

Children's charities based in England
Charities based in London
1981 establishments in England
2016 disestablishments in England